Debabrata Pradhan (born 10 October 1996) is an Indian cricketer. He made his List A debut for Odisha in the 2016–17 Vijay Hazare Trophy on 6 March 2017. He made his Twenty20 debut for Odisha in the 2017–18 Zonal T20 League on 8 January 2018. He made his first-class debut for Odisha in the 2018–19 Ranji Trophy on 1 November 2018.

References

External links
 

1996 births
Living people
Indian cricketers
Odisha cricketers
People from Sambalpur
Cricketers from Odisha